Sør-Varanger Avis is a Norwegian newspaper, published in Kirkenes, Norway, and covering the municipality of Sør-Varanger. The newspaper was founded in 1949, and its first editor was Jan W. Krohn Holm. The newspaper is issued three days per week. It had a circulation of 4,036 in 2008. 

The chief editor is Frode Nielsen Børfjord.

Former chief editors include Randi Fløtten Andreassen.

References

Publications established in 1949
1949 establishments in Norway
Mass media in Finnmark
Sør-Varanger
Newspapers published in Norway